Satyrus of Milan was the confessor and brother of Ambrose and Marcellina. He was born around 331 at Trier, Germany, moved to Rome with his family and was subsequently trained as a lawyer.

Appointed prefect to one of the Roman provinces, he resigned his post when Ambrose became Archbishop of Milan in order to assume administration of the secular affairs of the archdiocese.

He died unexpectedly at Milan in 378 and was eulogised by his brother with the funeral sermon, On the Death of a Brother (De excessu fratris Satyri).  The church of Santa Maria presso San Satiro in Milan refers to him.

He should not be confused with the bishop Satyrus of Arezzo.

See also
 Satyrus (disambiguation)
 Santa Maria presso San Satiro

References

External links

 San Satiro

331 births
Year of birth uncertain
378 deaths
4th-century Christian saints